The 2002 Clásica de San Sebastián was the 22nd edition of the Clásica de San Sebastián cycle race and was held on 10 August 2002. The race started and finished in San Sebastián. The race was won by Laurent Jalabert of the CSC team.

General classification

References

2002
2002 in Spanish road cycling
2002 UCI Road World Cup
August 2002 sports events in Europe